Ilıca  (literally "Spa") is a village in Mut district of  Mersin Province, Turkey. At  its situated in the Toros Mountains to the west of Turkish state highway  and Göksu River. The population of Ilıca was 559  as of 2012. It is a yayla and during the summers the population of the village increases. Main economic activity is agriculture and animal husbandry.

References

Villages in Mut District